Walter Farmer (1911–1997) was a captain in the United States Army Corps of Engineers. He drafted the Wiesbaden manifesto, which led much of the artwork the US Army had collected during World War II to be returned to their countries of origin.

Biography
Walter Farmer was born in Alliance, Ohio, and received bachelor's degrees in mathematics and architecture from Miami University in Oxford, Ohio. He went on to be active as a genealogist and was prominent in the museum field in Ohio and Texas. His marriages to Josselyn Liszniewska and to Renate Hobirk ended in divorce. Farmer died of cancer 11 August 1997 at the age of 86 at Christ Hospital in Cincinnati. He had a daughter, Margaret Farmer Planton; two grandsons; and a sister, Evelyn Krickbaum.

Monuments, Fine Arts, and Archives program
As part of the Monuments, Fine Arts, and Archives program, Farmer was put in charge of the Wiesbaden art collection point at the end of World War II. The collection points were Allied locations where artwork and cultural artifacts that the Nazi regime had confiscated and hidden throughout Germany and Austria were processed, photographed, and redistributed. In 1996, the German government honored Farmer with the crimson Commander's Cross of the Federal Order of Merit.

References

External links 
The Monuments Men
Walter I. Farmer Papers at the National Gallery of Art Archives

1911 births
1997 deaths
Monuments men
People from Alliance, Ohio
Deaths from cancer in Ohio
Miami University alumni
American genealogists
Art and cultural repatriation after World War II
20th-century American historians
American male non-fiction writers
Commanders Crosses of the Order of Merit of the Federal Republic of Germany
Historians from Ohio
20th-century American male writers